Niphogeton is a genus of flowering plant in the family Apiaceae.

Species
, Plants of the World Online accepted the following species:
Niphogeton azorelloides Mathias & Constance
Niphogeton boliviana Mathias & Constance
Niphogeton chirripoi (Suess.) Mathias & Constance
Niphogeton cleefii Mathias & Constance
Niphogeton colombiana Mathias & Constance
Niphogeton dissecta (Benth.) J.F.Macbr.
Niphogeton fruticosa Mathias & Constance
Niphogeton glaucescens (Kunth) J.F.Macbr.
Niphogeton josei Mathias & Constance
Niphogeton kalbreyeri (H.Wolff) Mathias & Constance
Niphogeton killipiana Mathias & Constance
Niphogeton lingula (Wedd.) Mathias & Constance
Niphogeton magna J.F.Macbr.
Niphogeton pusilla (Wedd.) Mathias & Constance
Niphogeton scabra (H.Wolff) J.F.Macbr.
Niphogeton sprucei (H.Wolff) Mathias & Constance
Niphogeton stricta (H.Wolff) Mathias & Constance
Niphogeton ternata (Willd. ex Schult.) Mathias & Constance

References

Further reading

 
Taxonomy articles created by Polbot
Apioideae genera